The Belgian Physical Society (BPS) ( and ) is the national physical society of Belgium, member of the European Physical Society. As a national scientific charity, its goal is to promote physics, advance physics education & research and support physicists in Belgium.

History
The Belgian Physical Society was founded on 16 February 1929 at the University Foundation, following an initiative of the national committee of physics. Its first president was the spectroscopist A. de Hemptinne, and the first vice-president was Th. De Donder, who contributed i.e., to the field of general relativity. The early archives of the society were lost during the second world war, when its activities were suspended. The rebirth of the BPS took place in 1949 under the presidency of Charles Manneback, and on 26 December 1962, the BPS became an association without lucrative purpose. In 1950, the society created its first journal, the "Bulletin of the Belgian Physical Society". This publication was succeeded by "Physicalia" in 1964, and by BPhy-Magazine (an electronic journal) in 2009. In 1970, under the presidency of Lieven Van Gerven, the society started its series of "general scientific meetings" which bring together physicists from all Belgian universities and research institutes, and of all physics disciplines.

Conferences
One of the main activities of the BPS is organizing international conferences such as the annual BPS general meeting. The conference location cycles between the ten different universities that offer physics programmes in Belgium, and is still organised yearly.

Prizes
Every year BPS awards several prizes to promising young physicists such as the BPS Young Speaker Contest, the BPS Poster Contest and the BPS Best Master Thesis Prize.

Publications
Its electronic magazine is BPhy-Magazine (since 2009), the successor of its former letters journal, Physicalia Magazine.

Presidents
List of presidents of the BPS:
2014–present: Jozef Ongena, Royal Military Academy
2012–2013: Gilles De Lentdecker, Université Libre de Bruxelles
2010–2012: Jacques Tempere, University of Antwerp
2008–2009: Luc Henrard, Facultés Universitaires Notre-Dame de la Paix de Namur
2006–2007: Patrick Wagner, Hasselt University
2004–2005: Viviane Pierrard, Belgian Institute for Space Aeronomy
2002–2003: Joseph Octave Indekeu, Katholieke Universiteit Leuven
2000–2001: Petra Rudolf, Facultés Universitaires Notre-Dame de la Paix de Namur
1998-1999: K. Michel
1996-1997: H.-P. Garnier
1994-1995: E. Jacobs
1991–1993: Guy Demortier, Facultés Universitaires Notre-Dame de la Paix de Namur
1990-1991: Yvan Bruynseraede
1987–1989: Charles J. Joachain, Université Catholique de Louvain
1986-1987: R. Dekeyser
1984-1985: Jean-Marie Gilles, Facultés Universitaires Notre-Dame de la Paix de Namur
1981-1982: A. De Ruytter
1980-1981: R. Ceuleneer
1978-1979: Jacques Lemonne, Vrije Universiteit Brussel
1976-1977: J. Vervier
1974-1975: G. Jacobs
1972-1973: J. Depireux
1970-1971: Lieven van Gerven, Katholieke Universiteit Leuven
1968-1969: J. Franeau
1965-1967: W. Dekeyser
1960-1964: G. A. Homes
1955-1959: P. Swings
1949-1954: Charles Manneback, Catholic University of Leuven and Royal Academies for Science and the Arts of Belgium
1929-1939: Alexandre de Hemptinne, Catholic University of Leuven

References

External links
 

Physics societies
Scientific organisations based in Belgium
Scientific organizations established in 1929